Shufu County is a county in Kashgar Prefecture, Xinjiang Uyghur Autonomous Region, China.

Shufu may refer to the following:
 Shūfu District, Ehime, was a district located in eastern Iyo Province (Ehime Prefecture), Japan
 Boniface Shufu, chief of the Mayeyi people of Namibia
 Li Shufu (born 1963), Chinese entrepreneur and founder of Geely 
 Jingdezhen porcelain, Chinese porcelain, also known as Shufu ware

See also 
 Shufu no Tomo, Japanese monthly women's magazine between 1917 and 2008